The Secret Four is a 1921 American action film serial directed by Albert Russell and Perry N. Vekroff. The film is now considered lost.

Plot
International spies compete to seize world power by cornering the market in oil supplies in the United States.

Cast
 Eddie Polo
 Kathleen Myers
 Doris Deane
 Hal Wilson
 William Welsh
 Thelma Daniels

Chapter titles
 Behind the Mask
 The House of Intrigue
 Across the Chasm
 The Dive of Despair
 Black Waters
 The Highway of Fate
 The Creeping Doom
 The Flaming Forest
 The Fight in the Dark
 The Burning Pit
 The Stampede of Death
 Floods of Fury
 The Man Trap
 The Hour of Twelve
 Black Gold

See also
 List of film serials
 List of film serials by studio
 List of lost films

References

External links

1921 films
1920s action films
1921 lost films
American silent serial films
American black-and-white films
Universal Pictures film serials
Films directed by Albert Russell
Films directed by Perry N. Vekroff
Lost American films
American action films
1920s American films
Lost action films
Silent action films